This is a list of all R-type contracts in the New York City Subway.

1930–1950

1951–1970

1971–1988

1989–1999

2000–2019 

All passenger rolling stock made in this time period are New Technology Trains.

2020–present 

 Car types that currently have CBTC: R143, R160 (all cars except 9943–9974) and R188.
 Car types that will have CBTC in the future: R142, R142A, R160 (remainder), R179, R211, and R262.

References

Further reading 
 Sansone, Gene. Evolution of New York City subways: An illustrated history of New York City's transit cars, 1867–1997. New York Transit Museum Press, New York, 1997. .
 Kramer, Frederick A. Building the Independent Subway. Quadrant Press, Inc.; New York, 1990. 
 Cudahy, Brian J. Under the Sidewalks of New York: The Story of the Greatest Subway System in the World, 2nd Revised Edition. Fordham University Press, New York, 1995. 
 Dougherty, Peter J. Tracks of the New York City Subway, version 4.2. 2007

External links 
 nycsubway.org New York City Subway Cars
 Pre-Unification Cars (BMT)
 Pre-Unification Cars (IRT)
 R-Type Cars 1932 to 1987
 R-Type Cars 1999 to Present (NTT)
 'R' Type Roster (includes non-train contracts)
 Roster of Rolling Stock Contracts
 NYCTA Work Cars 2013
 
 
 

 
New York City-related lists